Electoral history of Ted Stevens, United States Senator from Alaska (1968–2009), Senate Minority Whip (1977–1981), Senate Majority Whip (1981–1985), President pro tempore of the United States Senate (2003–2007) and President pro tempore emeritus (2007–2009)

At time of his 2008 defeat, Stevens was the 4th longest-serving Senator as well as most senior Republican in this body.

Early Senate and state legislature races (1962–1968)

Republican primary for the United States Senate from Alaska, 1962
 Ted Stevens – 11,000 (72.49%)
 Frank Cook – 4,175 (27.51%)

United States Senate election in Alaska, 1962
 Ernest Gruening (D) (inc.) – 33,827 (58.14%)
 Ted Stevens (R) – 24,354 (41.86%)

Alaska House of Representatives, 8th district, 1964
Elected:
 Mike Gravel (D) (inc.)
 Earl D. Hillstrand (D) (inc.)
 Joe Josephson (D) (inc.)
 Bruce Biers Kendall (R) (inc.)
 Carl F. Lottsfeldt (D) (inc.)
 Homer Moseley (D) (inc.)
 John L. Rader (D) (inc.)
 Harold D. Strandberg (R) (inc.)
 Carl F. Brady (R)
 Bernard J. Carr, Sr. (D)
 Gene Guess (D)
 M. D. Plotnick (D)
 Charles J. Sassara, Jr. (D)
 Ted Stevens (R)

Alaska House of Representatives, 8th district, 1966
Elected:
 Gene Guess (D) (inc.)
 William J. Moran (D) (inc.)
 Charles J. Sassara, Jr. (D) (inc.)
 Ted Stevens (R) (inc.)
 Harold D. Strandberg (R) (inc.)
 Michael F. Beirne (R)
 Ken Brady (R)
 Tom Fink (R)
 Milo Fritz (R)
 Jess Harris (R)
 M. M. Moore (R)
 Jack R. Simpson (R)
 Don Smith (R)
 William C. Wiggins (R)

Republican primary for the United States Senate from Alaska, 1968
 Elmer E. Rasmuson – 10,320 (53.11%)
 Ted Stevens – 9,111 (46.89%)

U.S. Senate races as an incumbent (1970–2008)

Open special primary for the United States Senate from Alaska, 1970
 Ted Stevens (R) (inc.) – 39,062 (55.91%)
 Wendell P. Kay (D) – 16,729 (23.94%)
 Joe Josephson (D) – 12,730 (18.22%)
 Fritz Singer (R) – 1,349 (1.93%)

Note: Stevens was appointed for the United States Senate following death of incumbent Bob Bartlett in December 1968

United States Senate special election in Alaska, 1970
 Ted Stevens (R) (inc.) – 47,908 (59.61%)
 Wendell P. Kay (D) – 32,456 (40.39%)

United States Senate election in Alaska, 1972
 Ted Stevens (R) (inc.) – 74,216 (77.30%)
 Gene Guess (D) – 21,791 (22.70%)

United States Senate election in Alaska, 1978
 Ted Stevens (R) (inc.) – 92,783 (75.59%)
 Donald W. Cobbs (D) – 29,574 (24.10%)
 Write-in – 384 (0.31%)

All-Party primary for the United States Senate from Alaska, 1984
 Ted Stevens (R) (inc.) – 65,522 (69.23%)
 John E. Havelock (D) – 19,074 (20.15%)
 Dave Carlson (D) – 4,620 (4.88%)
 Michael Beasley (D) – 2,443 (2.58%)
 Joe Tracanna (D) – 1,661 (1.76%)
 Phil Stoddard (D) – 1,331 (1.41%)

United States Senate election in Alaska, 1984
 Ted Stevens (R) (inc.) – 146,919 (71.17%)
 John E. Havelock (D) – 58,804 (28.49%)
 Write-in – 715 (0.35%)

Senate Majority Leader, 1984

Fourth ballot:
 Bob Dole – 28
 Ted Stevens – 25

All-Party primary for the United States Senate from Alaska, 1990
 Ted Stevens (R) (inc.) – 81,968 (59.19%)
 Michael Beasley (D) – 12,371 (8.93%)
 Robert M. Bird (R) – 34,824 (25.15%)
 Tom Taggart – 9,329 (6.74%)

United States Senate election in Alaska, 1990
 Ted Stevens (R) (inc.) – 125,806 (66.23%)
 Michael Beasley (D) – 61,152 (32.19%)
 Write-in – 2,999 (1.58%)

All-Party primary for the United States Senate from Alaska, 1996
 Ted Stevens (R) (inc.) – 71,043 (58.87%)
 Theresa Obermeyer (D) – 4,072 (3.37%)
 Jed Whittaker (Green) – 3,751 (3.11%)
 Dave W. Cuddy (R) – 32,994 (27.34%)
 Joseph A. Sonneman (D) – 2,643 (2.19%)
 Michael Beasley (D) – 1,968 (1.63%)
 Henry J. Blake, Jr. (D) – 1,157 (0.96%)
 Lawrence Freiberger (D) – 921 (0.76%)
 Charles E. McKee (R) – 842 (0.70%)
 Frank J. Vondersaar (D) – 655 (0.54%)
 Robert Alan Gigler (D) – 631 (0.52%)

United States Senate election in Alaska, 1996
 Ted Stevens (R) (inc.) – 177,893 (76.71%)
 Jed Whittaker (Green) – 29,037 (12.52%)
 Theresa Obermeyer (D) – 23,977 (10.34%)
 Write-in – 1,009 (0.44%)

Republican primary for the United States Senate from Alaska, 2002
 Ted Stevens (inc.) – 64,315 (88.94%)
 Mike Aubrey – 7,997 (11.06%)

United States Senate election in Alaska, 2002
 Ted Stevens (R) (inc.) – 179,438 (78.17%)
 Frank J. Vondersaar (D) – 24,133 (10.51%)
 Jim Sykes (Green) – 16,608 (7.24%)
 Jim Dore (Alaskan Independence) – 6,724 (2.93%)
 Len Karpinski (LBT) – 2,354 (1.03%)
 Write-in – 291 (0.13%)

Republican primary for the United States Senate from Alaska, 2008
 Ted Stevens (inc.) – 59,138 (63.53%)
 Dave W. Cuddy – 25,387 (27.27%)
 Vic Vickers – 5,204 (5.59%)
 Michael D. Corey – 1,283 (1.38%)
 Rick Sikma – 949 (1.02%)
 Rich M. Wanda – 621 (0.67%)
 Gerald L. Heikes – 500 (0.54%)

United States Senate election in Alaska, 2008
Mark Begich (D) 47.76%
Ted Stevens (R) (incumbent) 46.5%
Bob Bird (AIP) 4.16%
Fredrick David Haase (L) 0.79%

References

1962 Alaska elections
1964 Alaska elections
1966 Alaska elections
1968 Alaska elections
1970 Alaska elections
1972 Alaska elections
1978 Alaska elections
1984 Alaska elections
1990 Alaska elections
1996 Alaska elections
2002 Alaska elections
2008 Alaska elections
Stevens, Ted